Statistics of Second League of FR Yugoslavia for the 1995–96 season.

Overview
The league was divided into 2 groups, A and B, consisting each of 10 clubs. Both groups were played in league system. By winter break all clubs in each group meet each other twice, home and away, with the bottom four classified from A group moving to the group B, and being replaced by the top four from the B group. At the end of the season the same situation happened with four teams being replaced from A and B groups, adding the fact that the bottom three clubs from the B group were relegated into the third national tier. The champion and the second following team were promoted into the 1996–97 First League of FR Yugoslavia.

At the end of the season FK Budućnost Valjevo became champions, and together with OFK Kikinda, FK Železnik, FK Spartak Subotica, FK Rudar Pljevlja and FK Sutjeska Nikšić got promoted.

Club names
Some club names were written in a different way in other sources, and that is because some clubs had in their names the sponsorship company included. These cases were:
Budućnost Valjevo / Budućnost Vujić
RFK Novi Sad / Novi Sad Gumins
Jedinstvo Paraćin / Jedinstvo Cement

Final table

References

External sources
 Season tables at FSGZ

Yugoslav Second League seasons
Yugo
2